Nandini Ghosal is an Indian Bengali classical dancer, choreographer and actress. After making her acting debut in the 1997 drama film Char Adhyay, Nandini played leading role in several Bengali films, such as Kichhhu Sanlap Kichhu Pralap (1999) and a Malayalam movie Sthithi (2003).

Work
As a classical dancer, she learns to Odissi under Guru Poushali Mukherjee. After she took lesson under the tutelage of the maestro Guru Kelucharan Mahapatra. By this time she has played the central roles in several dance-dramas choreographed by Guru Mahapatra.

She had been a member of the World Arts Council, a UNESCO sponsored organization of the Valencian Government, Spain.

Filmography

References

External links

 
 
 

Living people
20th-century Indian dancers
21st-century Indian dancers
Indian female classical dancers
Performers of Indian classical dance
20th-century Indian actresses
21st-century Indian actresses
Indian film actresses
Actresses in Bengali cinema
Indian television actresses
Place of birth missing (living people)
Year of birth missing (living people)